The 1893 Chicago Athletic Association football team represented the Chicago Athletic Association, or C. A. A., during the 1893 college football season. In Harry Cornish's first year with the athletic club, CAA compiled an undefeated 8–0 record, and outscored their opponents 90 to 8. The team played its home games at CAA Field, located on the corner of 35th Street and Wentworth Avenue, in Chicago.

Schedule

Notes

References

Chicago Athletic Association
Chicago Athletic Association football seasons
Chicago Athletic Association football